Dolores National High School (Mataas na Paaralang Pambansa ng Dolores) one of the 12 public secondary schools of San Pablo City. Located at Brgy. Dolores, San Pablo City. Just like other public schools in the Philippines, it also caters free secondary education for the people of Dolores and neighboring barangays.

History 

Dolores National High School, formerly San Pablo City National High School – Dolores Annex, was established in 1995 to provide opportunities to the poor families of the nearby barangays to send their children to school with less cost on transportation and allowances. The school is situated within Dolores Elementary School compound and is now on its 14th year of successful operation. In 2005, it was recognized as a complete national high school with Mr. Ely Flores as its first principal.

Today, there are a total of 15 teachers teaching in 8 learning areas. The school consists of three classroom buildings and one administrative building. It has 9 sections from first to fourth year. Right now the school is faced with the task of improving the learners’ achievement level by 2012.

Educational institutions established in 1995
High schools in Laguna (province)
Schools in San Pablo, Laguna
1995 establishments in the Philippines